Simion Surdan (9 February 1940 – 10 July 2006) was a Romanian footballer who played as a central midfielder for CFR Timișoara and Politehnica Timișoara. While playing for Politehnica he scored one goal in the 1973–1974 Cupa României final which was lost with 4–2 to Jiul Petroșani. He also worked as a doctor.

International career
Surdan played one game at international level for Romania under coach Ilie Oană in a Euro 1968 qualifying match which ended with a 4–2 win against Switzerland.

Honours
Politehnica Timișoara
Divizia B: 1964–65, 1972–73
Cupa României runner-up: 1973–74

References

External links

Labtof profile

1940 births
2006 deaths
Romanian footballers
Romania international footballers
Association football midfielders
Liga I players
Liga II players
FC CFR Timișoara players
FC Politehnica Timișoara players